Francis Howell may refer to:

Francis Howell (philosopher) (1625–1679), English philosopher, principal of Jesus College, Oxford, 1657–1660
Francis S. Howell (1863–1937), justice of the Nebraska Supreme Court
Francis Clark Howell (1925–2007), American anthropologist

Schools 
 Francis Howell School District, a school district in St. Charles County, Missouri
 Francis Howell High School
 Francis Howell Central High School
 Francis Howell North High School

See also
Frances Howell (born 1969), birth name of English author Frances Osborne